Prehistoric fish are early fish that are known only from fossil records. They are the earliest known vertebrates, and include the first and extinct fish that lived through the Cambrian to the Quaternary. The study of prehistoric fish is called paleoichthyology. A few living forms, such as the coelacanth are also referred to as prehistoric fish, or even living fossils, due to their current rarity and similarity to extinct forms. Fish which have become recently extinct are not usually referred to as prehistoric fish. They were very different from what we have today. They likely were larger and had tougher scales.

Lists 
Lists of various prehistoric fishes include:

List of prehistoric jawless fish
List of placoderms
List of acanthodians
List of prehistoric cartilaginous fish
List of prehistoric bony fish
List of sarcopterygians

See also 
 Evolution of fish
 Prehistoric life
 Vertebrate paleontology

References

Other reading 
 Janvier, Philippe (1998

) Early Vertebrates,  Oxford, New York: Oxford University Press.  
 Long, John A. (1996) The Rise of Fishes: 500 Million Years of Evolution, Baltimore: The Johns Hopkins University Press.

External links
 Fossil Fish

 
Paleontology lists